Helvella atra is a species of fungi in the family Helvellaceae of the order Pezizales.

Distribution
This species has been found in China and Japan.  It is listed in A Field Guide to Mushrooms of the Carolinas and has been reported on iNaturalist as having been found once in western North Carolina and across similar latitudes, including several times across the Eastern US, in Europe, Russia, etc.

References

External links
Index Fungorum

atra
Fungi of Asia
Fungi of Europe